The Night Watch is a lost 1926 silent film directed by Fred Caldwell. It starred Mary Carr, Charles Delaney and Gloria Grey.

Plot summary

Cast
 Mary Carr as Mrs. Blackwell
 Charles Delaney as George Blackwell
 Gloria Grey as Nellie Powell
 Jack Richardson as Mr. Powell
 Muriel Reynolds -
 Raymond Rousenville - 
 Ethel Schram -
 Charles W. Mack -

References

External links
 IMDB profile
 
 
 

1926 films
American silent feature films
Lost American films
American black-and-white films
1926 drama films
1920s American films